Mallikassery is a small village near Paika, in Elikulam Panchayat of Kanjirappally Taluk in Kottayam district, in the state of Kerala, India.

Etymology
The place name originated from the story of Mallika named girl drawn in Ponnozhukum Thodu.

Location
A bus route from Paika to Pinnakkanadu cuts across Mallikassery. Ponnozhukumthodu, a tributary to the river Meenachil, flows by Mallikassery. Institutions in the village include St. Thomas Church, St. Dominic Savio U.P. School, SNDP Sree Narayana Guru Temple, and Adorno Fathers Seminary and Ashramam.

Economy
Mallikassery is an agricultural area. Mallikassery is a major rubber producing region, with rubber estates from 100 to 500 acres. Rubber estates in this area were traditionally owned by a wealthy family who had certain affiliations with Murphy saipu, the father of Indian rubber plantation industry. Families in this region assisted the wealthy family either as supervisors or servants in the estate and later shared their property. Mallikassery at present is an Industrial area of Elikulam Panchayath. There are three factories. Eva Hawai, Glenrock Rubber Products and Kokad Pharmaceuticals. There are only three buildings in the local town. Two of them are owned by local church. There is a ration shop and few other grocery shops and some tea shop. There are only a few number of government employees. Children of many parents from this region are settled abroad .

Demographics
The population consists of almost equal population of Syrian Catholic Christians and Hindus.

Access
 Thiruvananthapuram - Anchal - Punalur - Pathanamthitta - Ranni - Erumeli - Kanjirappally - Pinnakkanad - Mallikassery
 Kottayam - Ettumanoor - Pala - Paika - Mallikassery
 Kochi/Cochin - Thripunithura - Kanjiramattom - Kaduthuruthy - Kuravilangad - Pala - Paika - Mallikassery
 Kumily -  Peermedu - Kuttikkanam - Mundakkayam - Parathode - Chettuthodu - Pinnakkanad - Mallikassery

There are private busses plying through Mallikassery. The Paika-Pinnakanad Road, passing through Mallikassery, is a short cut route to Erumeli and hence Sabarimala. It is also short route to Mundakkayam and further east to Kuttikkanam, Peermedu, Kumily and Thekkadi.

The nearest town is Paika.  From Mallikassery, transport reaches most of the bigger towns in this region which includes Palai, Kanjirappally, Erattupetta, and Ponkunnam.  The District Capital Kottayam lies 39 km west.

The new alignment of Sabari Railway is through Mallikassery, not sure on whether will take place.

References

Villages in Kottayam district